Mon State Hluttaw is the legislature of the Burmese state of Mon State. It is a unicameral body, consisting of 31 members, including 23 elected members and 7 military representatives.  As of February 2016, the Hluttaw was led by speaker Tin Ei of the National League for Democracy (NLD).

In 2015 general election, the National League for Democracy (NLD) won the most contested seats in the legislature.

See also
State and Region Hluttaws
Pyidaungsu Hluttaw
Amyotha Hluttaw
Pyithu Hluttaw

References

External links
Official website

Unicameral legislatures
Mon State
Legislatures of Burmese states and regions